Tatjana Baļičeva (born 6 April 1998) is a Latvian footballer who plays as a forward for Sieviešu Futbola Līga club Rīgas FS and the Latvia women's national team.

References

1998 births
Living people
Latvian women's footballers
Women's association football forwards
Rīgas FS players
Latvia women's youth international footballers
Latvia women's international footballers